David Lang Snodgrass (born 21 November 1958) is a Scottish former cricketer.

Snodgrass was born at Glasgow in November 1958. He was educated at Hyndland Secondary School, before attending Glasgow College of Technology. A club cricketer for the West of Scotland Cricket Club, he made his debut for Scotland in a List A one-day match against English county opponents Lancashire in the 1982 Benson & Hedges Cup. Later that season he made his first-class debut against Ireland at Edinburgh; he played first-class cricket for Scotland until 1989, making five appearances all against Ireland. In one-day cricket, he played until 1989, making 16 appearances in the Benson & Hedges Cup and the NatWest Trophy. In his five first-class matches, he scored 91 runs with a highest score of 49, while with his medium pace bowling he took 5 wickets at an average of 27.80. In one-day cricket he scored 130 runs with a highest score of 28, while with the ball he took 7 wickets at an average of 32.42, with best figures of 3 for 44. Outside of cricket, he worked in the IT industry.

References

External links
 

1958 births
Living people
Cricketers from Glasgow
People educated at Hyndland Secondary School
Alumni of Glasgow Caledonian University
Scottish cricketers